A Week Away is a 2021 American Christian jukebox musical teen drama film directed by Roman White. The film was written by Alan Powell, Kali Bailey, and Gabe Vasquez. The film's songs were produced and mixed by Adam Watts and co-produced by Cory Clark (the team also co-wrote the film's original songs with Powell). It stars Bailee Madison, Kevin Quinn, David Koechner, and Sherri Shepherd with cameos from Amy Grant and Steven Curtis Chapman. Producers for the film are Alan Powell, Gabe Vasquez, and Steve Barnett. The film premiered on March 26, 2021, on Netflix. The film introduces songs of Christian artists such as Michael W. Smith, Amy Grant, and Steven Curtis Chapman to a younger generation with modern renditions of songs like "The Great Adventure", "Dive", "Baby, Baby", and "Place in This World."

Plot 
The film starts with Will (Kevin Quinn) running from the police because he stole a cop car. This time his actions have landed him in a situation where he's facing juvenile hall. But as his saving grace, a foster mother Kristin (Sherri Shepherd), with her son George (Jahbril Cook), visits officer Mark (Ed Amatrudo) handling Will's case and Will gets to choose between juvie and a summer camp. Will ends up choosing the camp and from there he starts quite a journey. When he reaches there, a girl named Avery (Bailee Madison) catches his eye. George and Will share a cabin and there Will finds out that George likes a girl named Presley (Kat Conner Sterling). Will makes a deal with George that he’ll help the latter with Presley if George helps him with Avery. At night all the campers attend The Tribunal to compete in the camp’s war games. After the truth about his situation is revealed to Will's friends, Will leaves the camp. Avery drives after him and tries to get him to return without succeeding. He struggles with the thought of there being a loving God after what happened to his family. 
In the end, Will decides to return to the camp and he and Avery share a moment and a kiss together. When he didn't expect it, he discovers people who care about him.

Cast 
 Bailee Madison as Avery
 Kevin Quinn as William "Will" Hawkins
 Jahbril Cook as George
 Kat Conner Sterling as Presley
 Iain Tucker as Sean Withers
 David Koechner as David Farrell
 Sherri Shepherd as Kristin Alway
 Ed Amatrudo as Mark Pearson
 Mari Kasuya as Dancer
 Brooke Maroon as Dancer
 Chelsea Corp as Dancer
 Goria Cunningham as Extra
 Brooklyn Wittmer as Camper
 Rena MacMonegle as Camper
 Steven Curtis Chapman as Lifeguard (cameo)
 Amy Grant as Camp Counselor (cameo)

Soundtrack

Track listing

Awards and nominations

References

External links
 
 

2020s musical drama films
2021 films
English-language Netflix original films
Films about Christianity
2020s English-language films
American teen musical films
American teen drama films
Jukebox musical films
2020s American films